Sir Osmund Somers Cleverly  (1891 – 21 October 1966) was a British civil servant who, between 1935 and 1939, served as Principal Private Secretary to the Prime Minister.

Early life 
Osmund Cleverly was born in 1891 at London to artist, Charles Frederick Moore Cleverly and Mary Isabel Cleverly. His baptism is recorded as having taken place on 10 December 1891 in the parish of St. Mary the Virgin. For his schooling he was educated at Rugby School and Magdalen College, Oxford. Following the outbreak of the First World War he saw active service in India and Mesopotamia between 1914 and 1919.

Career

War Office 
After the war he entered the British Civil Service, where he worked at the War Office between 1919 and 1935.

Principal Private Secretary 
In 1935 he was appointed Private Secretary and then Principal Private Secretary to the Prime Minister. In this capacity he served the British Prime Ministers Stanley Baldwin and Neville Chamberlain between 1935 and 1939.

Ministry of Supply 
He served as Deputy Secretary in the Ministry of Supply in the early years of the Second World War between 1939 and 1941.

Commissioner of Crown Lands 
From 1941 to 1952 he was Commissioner of Crown Lands and was called out of retirement to fill the role between 1954 and 1955 after the Crichel Down Affair.

Personal life 
Cleverly married Priscilla Simpson, daughter of Prof. Frederick Moore Simpson , in 1920 with whom he had two sons and a daughter. He was appointed Commander of the Royal Victorian Order (CVO) in the 1937 Coronation Honours, Companion of the Order of the Bath (CB) in the King's Birthday Honours 1939, and Knighted in The King's Birthday Honours 1951.

He died on 21 October 1966 with his funeral held at St. James's Church in Shere, Surrey.

References 

  alongside Sir Harold Vincent in 1935–1936

1891 births
1966 deaths
British civil servants
Principal Private Secretaries to the Prime Minister